A Doll's House (Swedish: Ett dockhem) is a 1956 Swedish drama film directed by Anders Henrikson and starring Mai Zetterling, Gunnel Broström and George Fant. It was shot at the Sundbyberg Studios of Europa Film in Stockholm. The film's sets were designed by the art director Arne Åkermark. It is based on the 1886 short story of the same title by August Strindberg, which he had written is response to Henrik Ibsen's 1879 play A Doll's House. It was released in the United States in a double bill with Getting Married under the alternative title Of Love and Lust.

Cast
 Mai Zetterling as 	Gurli Pall
 Gunnel Broström as Ottilia Sandegren
 George Fant as Wilhelm Pall
 Hjördis Petterson as Gurli's mother 
 Torsten Lilliecrona as Physician
 Einar Axelsson as 	War commissioner 
 Artilio Bergholtz as 	Jonathan Pall 
 Mats Björne as 	Officer 
 Svea Holm as 	Lovisa 
 Axel Högel as 	Bosun 
 Gittan Larsson as 	Maid 
 Marianne Lindberg as 	Maid 
 Charlotte Lindell as Lillan Pall 
 Carin Lundquist as 	Maid 
 Wilma Malmlöf as 	Boarding house manager 
 Hans Strååt as Second mate 
 Hans Sundberg as 	Oarsman
 Åke Svensson as 	Mailman

References

Bibliography 
 Qvist, Per Olov & von Bagh, Peter. Guide to the Cinema of Sweden and Finland. Greenwood Publishing Group, 2000.

External links 
 

1956 films
1956 drama films
1950s Swedish-language films
Films directed by Anders Henrikson
Swedish black-and-white films
Films set in the 19th century
Swedish historical drama films
1950s historical drama films
Films based on works by August Strindberg
Films based on short fiction
1950s Swedish films